The Lady from the City is a 1976 Albanian comedy film directed by Piro Milkani, starring Violeta Manushi as Teto Ollga.

Plot
The film tells the story of Ollga, an old lady from the city that moved to the village to stay with her daughter, a young beautiful girl. Under socialism, young people were routinely sent to villages after graduation to work in order to get experience as well as contribute to previously underserved communities in their field of study. Her daughter, Meli, (Rajmonda Bulku) studied as a nurse. Teto Ollga had an attitude of superiority toward villagers, but at the end, she finds herself comfortable among them and she becomes useful as she starts working as chef. The movie features a great view of the village, Tushemisht, located in Pogradec, Albania, with its numerous canals, the lake, Drilon springs, and high mountains.

Cast
Violeta Manushi as Ollga
Rajmonda Bulku as Meli 
Stavri Shkurti as Sala, Party's First Secretary
Pandi Raidhi as Bako Këmbora
Yllka Mujo as Shpresa
Piro Kita as Bujar
Sotiraq Bratko as Tirka
Vasillaq Vangjeli as Koçi
Hasan Fico as Malua
Vangjel Grabocka as Shahin

References

External links
 

1976 romantic comedy films
Albanian comedy films
1976 films